Richard George Farman (July 26, 1916 – May 5, 2002) was an American football offensive lineman in the National Football League (NFL) for the Washington Redskins.  He played college football at Washington State University and was drafted in the sixteenth round of the 1939 NFL Draft.

References

External links
 

 

1916 births
2002 deaths
People from Wright County, Iowa
Players of American football from Iowa
American football offensive guards
Washington State Cougars football players
Washington Redskins players